Prince Henry's Battery was an artillery battery built in Gibraltar during the Anglo-Spanish War of 1762–63, adjoining the Prince of Wales Lines. They mounted three 32-pdr guns with two more 18-pdrs, six 12-pdrs and three 4-pdrs on the Lines. After 1841, the battery was rebuilt as a retired battery as part of a mid-19th century remodelling of Gibraltar's southern defences. They were eventually built over in 1859–60 when the Prince of Wales Batteries were constructed on the same site.

References

Bibliography

 

Batteries in Gibraltar
Coastal artillery